Monostrontium ruthenate is the inorganic compound with the formula SrRuO3.  It is one of two main strontium ruthenates, the other having the formula Sr2RuO4.  SrRuO3 is a ferromagnetic.  It has a perovskite structure as do many complex metal oxides with the ABO3 formula.  The Ru4+ ions occupy the octahedral sites and the larger Sr2+ ions are distorted 12-coordinate.

References

Strontium compounds
Ruthenium(IV) compounds
Transition metal oxides
Ferromagnetic materials
Perovskites